Bashkaro Pass or Bashkaro Top is a pass (class T - Hypsographic) in Pakistan, with the region font code of Asia/Pacific. It is located at an elevation of 4,924 meters above sea level. Its coordinates are 35°52'55" N and 72°32'27" E in DMS (Degrees Minutes Seconds) or 35.8819 and 72.5408 (in decimal degrees). Its UTM position is BV77 and its Joint Operation Graphics reference is NI43-01.

Bashkāro Pass is also known as Kukush Pass and Bashkarn An which connects Swat Valley with Ghizer Valley, GB. A Pass is a break in a mountain range or other high obstruction, used for transportation from one side to the other. Its starting point is Mahodand Lake and the ending point is Langar, Ghizer

The pass is a demanding and rarely crossed pass and link the upper Ghizer Valley with the Ushu Gol in Kalam Kohistan to the south. This is approximately a 60km trek through Hinduksh range featuring mighty lakes rivers and glaciers.

See also 

 Khunjerab Pass
 Burzil Pass
 Khyber Pass

References 

Mountain passes of Khyber Pakhtunkhwa
Mountain passes of Pakistan
Swat District